Stanley James Weston (26 November 1889 – 23 December 1967) was a New Zealand rugby league footballer who represented New Zealand.

Early life
Weston was born in Auckland to Stephen James Weston. He had two brothers and three sisters. His younger brother, Lyn Weston, also played rugby union.

Playing career
Weston played for the North Shore club in the Auckland Rugby League competition and represented Auckland. He played for North Shore from 1911 to 1914 when he retired from playing. He did however take up refereeing and began refereeing senior club games in the 1917 season.

He was selected for New Zealand as part of the 1912 tour of Australia, although no test matches were played on the tour. In 1914 he played in one test match against the touring Great Britain Lions.

Later life
Lyn and Stan Weston were both garage proprietors in Whangārei in the 1930s. He died in Whangārei on 23 December 1967 and was buried at Maunu Cemetery.

References

1889 births
1967 deaths
New Zealand rugby league players
New Zealand national rugby league team players
Auckland rugby league team players
North Shore Albions players
Rugby league wingers